Chiang Hsiao-yung (also known as Eddie Chiang; October, 1948 – December 22, 1996) was a politician of the Republic of China.

Biography
Chiang was born in Shanghai, Republic of China in 1948. He was the third son of Chiang Ching-kuo, the President of the Republic of China in Taiwan from 1978 to 1988. His mother was Faina Ipatyevna Vakhreva, also known as Chiang Fang-liang. He had two older brothers, Hsiao-wen and Hsiao-wu, and one older sister, Hsiao-chang. He also had two half-brothers, Winston Chang and John Chiang, with whom he shared the same father.

After a brief political career in the Kuomintang in 1988, he emigrated to Canada with his family. In 1996, he died in Taiwan at the Taipei Veterans General Hospital as a result of esophageal cancer, aged 48. He was survived by his wife Chiang Fang Chi-yi and three sons.

, Chiang Fang Chi-yi is a member of the Kuomintang Central Committee while his eldest son Demos Chiang is a successful designer and businessman. Andrew Chiang, his youngest son, was charged with making threatening comments against the faculty of the Taipei American School through email and Facebook in 2013. He was convicted in 2015, and fined NT$183,000.

References

1948 births
1996 deaths
Chiang Kai-shek family
Kuomintang politicians in Taiwan
Republic of China politicians from Shanghai
Canadian people of Chinese descent
Taiwanese people of Belarusian descent
Taiwanese people from Shanghai